NIIT University (Or NU) is a private university founded in 2009.  It is located in Neemrana Rajasthan in India. It was founded by Mr. Rajendra Singh Pawar, Chairman of NIIT Ltd and NIIT Technologies Ltd.

The University was established by an Ordinance of the Government of Rajasthan on 13 October 2009 and subsequently on 4 April 2010 vide Rajasthan Gazette Notification No. F.(11) Vidhi/2/2010, THE NIIT UNIVERSITY, NEEMRANA (ALWAR) ACT, 2010 (Act No. 5 of 2010).

History

NIIT University was founded by Rajendra Singh Pawar in 2009. The university offers undergraduate, postgraduate and doctoral programmes in Computer Science, Electronics and Communications, Biotechnology and Management. NIIT University partnered with ICICI Bank and launched MBA in Finance and Banking. In 2015, the university started MBA in [Business Analytics] jointly with WNS. NIIT University announced a partnership with PwC in 2015 to launch a masters course in cyber security. The university has launched Integrated MBA programme from 2018.

Courses
The college offers following courses:
Bachelor of Technology in 
 Computer Science Engineering
 Electronics and Communications Engineering
 Biotechnology
Masters of Technology in
 Geographic Information Systems
 Education Technology
 Cyber Security
BBA Programmes
MBA Programmes
PhD Programmes

Post Graduate Diploma In banking  & Finance

Campus
NIIT University has a 100 acres fully residential campus. It has 2 men's hostels, 2 women's hostel, and 3 dining halls. The campus has several recreational facilities like football and cricket fields, basketball, volleyball and tennis courts and a pool room.

The academic centers are equipped with latest, state of the art labs, classrooms, a 240-seater auditorium and library.

Rankings
NIIT University was ranked among the top 50 Indian universities of the future by India Today Aspire.

See also
 Neemrana
 List of private universities in India
 List of institutions of higher education in Rajasthan
 List of universities in India
 Universities and colleges in India
 Education in India

References

External links
 Official website

Neemrana
Education in Alwar district
Universities in Rajasthan
2009 establishments in Rajasthan
Educational institutions established in 2009